Voltron is an animated television series franchise  that features a team of space explorers who pilot a giant Super Robot known as "Voltron". Produced by Peter Keefe (Executive Producer) and Ted Koplar through his production company World Events Productions, Voltron was an adaptation of several Japanese anime television series from Toei Animation. The original television series aired in syndication from September 10, 1984, to November 18, 1985. The first season of Voltron, featuring the "Lion Force Voltron", was adapted from the series Beast King GoLion. The second season, featuring the "Vehicle Team Voltron", was adapted from the unrelated series Armored Fleet Dairugger XV.

Voltron: Defender of the Universe was the top-rated syndicated children's show for two years during its original run, and it spawned three follow-up series, several comic books, and a line of toys.

Television series

Lion Force Voltron and Vehicle Team Voltron (Voltron of the Near Universe; Voltron I, 1984–1985)

The second series was primarily edited from Armored Fleet Dairugger XV, with the storyline considerably changed. In this iteration of Voltron, the Galaxy Alliance's home planets are now overcrowded, and a fleet of explorers is sent to search for new planets to colonize. Along the way, they attract the attention of the evil Drule Empire, long engaged in an ongoing war against the Alliance, and the Drules proceed to interfere with the mission of the explorers and the colonists. Since the Arusian Voltron is too far away to help these explorers, a totally new Voltron has to be constructed to battle the Drule threat.

This Voltron Force consists of fifteen members, divided into three teams of five, known respectively as the Land, Sea, and Air Teams.
Each team is specialized in gathering data or fighting in their area of expertise. Each team can combine their vehicles into a bigger machine, with each combined vehicle differing among the three teams. These fighters are:

The Aqua Fighter (Sea Team)
The Turbo Terrain Fighter (Land Team)
The Strato Fighter (Air Team)

When necessary, all fifteen vehicles combine to form the mighty Voltron. However, the Vehicle Team Voltron only had enough stored solar energy to operate for five minutes.

In the toy line, this Voltron was referred to as Voltron I because it was set closest to Earth.

Gladiator Voltron (Voltron of the Middle Universe; Voltron II)
Although Matchbox did produce and market toy versions of the three robots (Black Alpha, Blue Beta, Red Gamma) under the "Voltron II" name, the series never actually aired. Due to the extreme popularity of the Lion Force Voltron and the lack of popularity of the Vehicle Team Voltron series, World Events Productions eventually elected against another alternate Voltron, and plans to adapt Albegas were aborted.

Voltron: Fleet of Doom (1986)

In 1986, World Events hired Toei Animation to produce the one-off crossover television special Voltron: Fleet of Doom, which mixed in GoLion and Dairugger XV footage with new animation. The special was made for the international market and, as of the middle of September 2016, it had not been released in Japan.

Voltron: The Third Dimension (1998–2000)

The computer-generated series Voltron: The Third Dimension was released in 1998, set five years after the end of the original Lion Voltron series. The series was met with a mixed response, due to various changes, such as the revamped looks of the Lion Voltron, King Zarkon, and Prince Lotor. The series served as a sequel to the Lion Force Voltron series; among the tools used to bridge the gap between the two series was an official starmap as designed by Shannon Muir and finalized in partnership with World Events Productions. After Voltron: The Third Dimension, World Events Productions went back to the drawing board to develop a more traditionally animated series in an attempt to recapture the spirit of the original.

Voltron Force (2011–2012)

The animated series Voltron Force premiered on Nicktoons in June 2011. The series follows the exploits of a group of three young cadets brought together by the original members of the Voltron Force to defend the galaxy against a resurrected Lotor, now ruling the planet Drule after a military coup d'état. Voltron Force is a World Events Production in conjunction with Kick Start Productions and Classic Media.

Voltron: Legendary Defender (2016–2018)

The Netflix exclusive series Voltron: Legendary Defender, produced by DreamWorks Animation, is a reboot of the Voltron story. The series premiered on June 10, 2016, with Joaquim Dos Santos and Lauren Montgomery serving as showrunners. On January 5, 2016, Netflix announced that Voltron would debut in 2016 as an original animated Netflix series in partnership with DreamWorks Animation (DWA), part of an expanded multi-year agreement between the two groups. In February, teasers revealed the title of the new series to be Voltron: Legendary Defender. On March 25, 2016, a teaser trailer was released, announcing that the first season, consisting of 13 episodes, would premiere June 10, 2016. A second season premiered on Netflix on January 20, 2017. The third season premiered on Netflix on August 4, 2017, and consisted of 7 episodes while the fourth season premiered on October 13, 2017, and consisted of 6 episodes. The fifth season premiered on March 2, 2018, and consists of six episodes. The sixth season premiered on June 15, 2018, and consists of seven episodes. The seventh season premiered August 10, 2018 and consists of 13 episodes. The eighth and final season premiered on December 14, 2018, and consists of 13 episodes. The series' success has spawned several comics, action figures, and other toys.

Potential live-action film
In July 2005, producer Mark Gordon (Grey's Anatomy, The League of Extraordinary Gentlemen) announced plans to create a live-action film adaptation of the Voltron franchise in collaboration with producers Pharrell Williams, Mark Costa, and Frank Oelman. Pharrell Williams was also reported to compose the musical score for the film. The project's development was funded by Jim Young's Animus Films. In December 2006, screenwriter Enzo Marra was announced to have completed a script for Gordon. In August 2007, the production entity New Regency entered negotiations with The Mark Gordon Company to adapt Voltron. Interest in the property heightened after the box office success of Transformers, another film involving shape-changing robots. Mark's script was described as "a post-apocalyptic tale set in New York City...[in which] five ragtag survivors of an alien attack band together and end up piloting the five lion-shaped robots that combine and form the massive sword-wielding Voltron that helps battle Earth's invaders." On August 18, 2008, Relativity Media entered negotiations with New Regency to finance and produce the film, though on a more moderate budget, utilizing cost-saving CGI techniques such as those used in 300. Max Makowski was slated to direct. As of the end of August 2008, the title had been set for Voltron: Defender of the Universe. Relativity would have released the film in North America while New Regency's distribution partner, 20th Century Fox, would handle international distribution. But at that time, Ted Koplar, through his World Events Production Company (Koplar took over the company as the health of Peter Keefe declined; Keefe died in 2010 at age 57), was fighting a legal battle with Toei Company Ltd. over the movie rights as of November of that year. On September 16, 2010, concept art for the movie was released. On March 8, 2011, it was announced that Relativity Media and World Events had entered a bidding war on who would make the film. Thomas Dean Donnelly and Joshua Oppenheimer entered into collaboration on writing the script. On July 21, 2011, Atlas Entertainment & Relativity Media announced they would bring Voltron: Defender of the Universe to the big screen. Relativity Media would distribute. On July 30, 2015, Relativity filed for Chapter 11 bankruptcy in the United States Bankruptcy Court for the Southern District of New York after lawsuits and missing loan payments, and the film rights reverted to Classic Media. On November 4, 2016, three months after the completion of NBCUniversal's acquisition of Classic Media's parent company, DreamWorks Animation for $3.8 billion, it was announced that Universal Pictures and DreamWorks Animation will make the film with David Hayter writing the script.

In March 2022, it was announced that the live-action film was officially back in development with Rawson Marshall Thurber directing and co-writing the screenplay with Ellen Shanman, and produced by Todd Lieberman, David Hoberman, and Bob Koplar. The film also incited a bidding war between Warner Bros. Pictures, Universal Pictures, and Amazon Prime Video. Amazon is leading the bid.

Characters

Note: A gray cell indicates the character did not appear in that medium.

DVD releases

In Australia, DVDs of all episodes of Voltron were released by Madman Entertainment as the 20th Anniversary Edition, Lion Force Voltron Collection. The original series was released in five volumes between August 2004 and July 2005, under the name Voltron: Defender of the Universe. Each box was in the color and style of one of the lions with a metallic glossy inner DVD-case. Another three volumes of "Vehicle Team Voltron" were released between August and December 2005. In addition, a "Best of" 2-DVD set released in November 2006 featured five episodes from each series. Finally, a 24-disc boxset subtitled The Lion and Vehicle Force Complete Collection was released on June 24, 2009. Madman Entertainment has since relinquished the rights to the Voltron series and has since been re-released by Beyond Home Entertainment. Previous licensees of Voltron in Australia have been CBS/Fox Video and Manga Entertainment.

Prior to the release of the boxed sets, a promotional DVD was released for Voltron. It was packed in a threefold glossy cardboard folder. The folder featured full-color artwork and text about the then-upcoming release of Voltron on DVD. The disk had an image of Voltron, and was labeled for promotional use only. It featured the first episode, "Space Explorers Captured", and several promos for other series.

In Region 1, Voltron was released on DVD in its original broadcast form and remastered, restored, and remixed by New York-based distributor Media Blasters (via their AnimeWorks unit) in eight volumes between September 2006 and July 2009. The volumes contain approximately fifteen episodes each, along with special features such as interviews with producer and director Franklin Cofod, and various others involved in the original and current productions. The first five volumes together contain all the Lion Force episodes, which were broadcast as seasons 1 and 3, while the next three contain the Vehicle Team episodes, broadcast as season 2.

The Fleet of Doom special was released on DVD early in 2007, as an online Voltron.com exclusive. Media Blasters released Fleet of Doom on July 28, 2009, as a full retail release. A Blu-ray version was planned, but it was delayed many times and was finally officially canceled.

The first volume of the original series was released in the UK in 2007 by Manga Entertainment.

According to TVShowsOnDVD.com, Voltron: The Third Dimension was to be released on DVD at some point, but no release date has been announced currently.

Media Blasters/AnimeWorks also released the two Japanese shows that made up Voltron — Beast King GoLion and Armored Fleet Dairugger XV — each in their original, unedited Japanese form, with English subtitles. Volume 1 of GoLion was released on May 27, 2008, Volume 2 on August 12, 2008, and Volume 3 on November 25, 2008. GoLion was re-released as a complete chronology set with all 52 episodes on April 13, 2010. The first Dairugger XV DVD collection was released on February 23, 2010, the second Dairugger XV collection was released on May 25, 2010. The third and final collection was originally scheduled to be released in September 2010, but was repeatedly delayed and finally released on January 4, 2011.

As of mid-2011, Classic Media (DreamWorks Classics) now owns the rights to Voltron on DVD.

On September 24, 2019, Universal Pictures Home Entertainment released Voltron: Defender of the Universe: The Complete Collection on DVD and Blu-ray in Region 1, which includes the 3-disc set as well as all 72 episodes from Voltron 84 on DVD for the first time. The series is also scheduled for DVD releases in the UK, France, Italy, Spain, and Germany.

Digital releases
As of July 2011 all Lion Force episodes have been released on Hulu. Minisodes of the first twenty episodes of the first season can be streamed for free online on Crackle.

Following the success of Voltron: Legendary Defender, Netflix released 12 episodes of Defender of the Universe as Voltron '84 on March 24, 2017. Each episode is introduced by members of the cast and crew of Legendary Defender.

Soundtracks
The Voltron television franchise has produced soundtracks for three of its series which have been released exclusively on the iTunes and the Google Play stores. The first soundtrack release was on September 27, 2012, for the original Lions series with music composed by John Petersen. The second soundtrack release was on October 1, 2012, for the Third Dimension series with music composed by Stephen Martson and the third release on July 21, 2016, for the first season of the Legendary Defender series with music composed by Brad Breeck, Brian Parkhurst, and Alex Geringas. Currently, there are no plans to release any of the soundtrack to a non-digital version such as a physical album or CD.

Comic books

1980s
In 1985, Modern Comics, an imprint of Charlton Comics, produced a three-issue mini-series based on the Lion Voltron television show.

2000s

In 2002, comic book publisher Devil's Due announced that it had acquired the rights to publish Voltron comic books. Devil's Due, through Image Comics, published a five issue mini-series (preceded by a #0 issue from Dreamwave) which featured the Lion Voltron incarnation of the character and rebooted the property. This was then followed by an ongoing series self-published by Devil's Due, which was placed on hiatus in 2005 after the eleventh issue, due to poor sales.

Devil's Due announced in January 2008 that the five-issue mini-series, the eleven issues of the ongoing series, and the #0 issue would be collected into a Voltron Omnibus trade paperback that would also include the unpublished twelfth issue of the ongoing series that would wrap up all the storylines.

In July 2008, a new five issue mini-series was released by Devil's Due, which picked up where the ongoing series left off. This series further explored the origins of Lion Voltron's creation, from 12,000 years in the past to the present day. The mini-series showed Voltron existing as a single construct created by sorcerers and scientists, resembling a knight. During its battle with the first Drule Empire, Voltron was tricked by Haggar into landing on a black comet with the gravitational attraction of a singularity. Voltron was then attacked by Haggar, and blown into five pieces. However, the intervention of a sorcerer resulted in the five pieces becoming the five lions as they descended onto Arus.

The original five issue mini-series was adapted as the 2007 motion comic Voltron: Defenders of the Universe - Revelations. Its sequel, Voltron: Defenders of the Universe - Paradise Lost, adapted the first story arc of the ongoing series, introducing the V-15 and its pilots. The Devil's Due run is now collected digitally exclusively through Devil's Due Digital.

2010s
In 2011, Dynamite Entertainment announced plans to publish Voltron comics, while Viz Media's young readers imprint, Viz Kids, announced plans to publish a series of graphic novels called Voltron Force, on which Bian Smith would serve as head writer, and Jacob Chabot and Dario Brizuela would serve as lead artists.

In September 2015, Dynamite released Voltron: From The Ashes, written by Cullen Bunn with art by Blacky Shepherd.

Toys

Matchbox
Matchbox imported the Lion Force Voltron, Gladiator Voltron, and Vehicle Force Voltron diecast toys from Popy of Japan in 1984. The company also released 6-inch figures of the Voltron robots that were more affordable, but lacked the detail level of their larger counterparts and could not separate into their component forms.

Panosh Place
At the peak of the series' popularity, Panosh Place released new Voltron toys, including action figures of the characters and a larger Voltron toy that could fit them.

Trendmasters
To coincide with the 1998 broadcast of Voltron: The Third Dimension, the now-defunct Trendmasters reissued the Matchbox diecast Lion Force Voltron, with a few changes to the mold and a total of 17 weapons in comparison to the original's sword and shield. Trendmasters also released the newer Stealth Voltron variant, as well as character action figures and the robots Voltrex and Dracotron.

Toynami
Shortly after the demise of Trendmasters, Toynami acquired the Voltron license and released their Masterpiece Voltron toy in 2005. Boasting more detail and articulation than the previous toys, the Masterpiece Voltron sold for US$139 to US$149.99 at the time of its release. In 2007, Toynami sold an all-plastic version of the Masterpiece Voltron for up to one-third of the first release's price (ranging from US$49 to US$60). For the 25th anniversary of the cartoon franchise in 2009, the plastic Masterpiece Voltron was reissued in a metallic repaint.

Mattel
In late 2011, Mattel released toys for the new Voltron Force series, while its online collectors' site MattyCollector.com sold brand new toys for the classic series - including a 23-inch Voltron that fits 4-inch pilot figures in each lion.

Playmates Toys
In 2017, Playmates Toys released toys based on Voltron: Legendary Defender.

Bandai
In early 2017 Bandai Japan, who produced the toys of Beast King GoLion and Armored Fleet Dairugger XV back in their initial releases, released a Soul of Chogokin version of the GoLion robot. The box was repackaged as Voltron for its American release. A Dairugger XV version was later produced in 2019, similarly branded as Vehicle Voltron in the US release.

Lego
In August 2017, Lego announced that a forthcoming Lego Ideas set based upon classic Voltron will be placed into production. The set was released on August 1, 2018, coinciding with the final seasons of Voltron: Legendary Defender.

Other merchandise
Privateer Press released a Voltron: Defender of the Universe expansion set for their Monsterpocalypse battle miniatures game series in 2010.

In 2012, Voltron was shown in MetLife's "Everyone" commercial during Super Bowl XLVI.

Video games

Voltron: Defender of the Universe (2011)

In December 2009, Sony Pictures Home Entertainment announced the first ever Voltron video game would be released on mobile phones in the US, including the iPhone. The game would have 30 levels and 6 acts, isometric gameplay and gamers will command robot lions to traverse the galaxy and take on King Zarkon's evil droid armies. In 2011, Voltron: Defender of the Universe, produced by THQ and Behaviour Interactive, was developed for home console play. A 1-5 player co-op game, it was released on November 29, 2011, for the PlayStation Network and November 30, 2011, for the Xbox Live Arcade. The First Trailer has been announced on IGN.com and tentatively priced at $10. Players will be able fight as the individual lions in an overhead shooter style gameplay to then form Voltron to take on Robeasts in a fighter style combat.

Voltron: Cubes of Olkarion (2019)
In 2018, NBCUniversal announced the video game Voltron: Cubes of Olkarion, the winner of their developer competition Universal GameDev Challenge that had offered game developers the opportunity to use some of Universal's IP. In 2019, Voltron: Cubes of Olkarion, produced by indie game studio Gbanga, was made published on the Steam store in Early Access, the platform's experimental game program. In the game, players compete in real-time player vs player (PvP) game battles by placing own and destroying opponent blocks with different features in a game board with a grid.

Animation staff
 Original story: Saburo Yatsude
 Chief Director: Katsuhiko Taguchi
 Character Designer & Chief Animation Director: Kazuo Nakamura
 Episode Directors: Kazufumi Nomura, Kazuyuki Okaseko, Hiroshi Sasagawa, Katsuhiko Taguchi, Katsuhito Akiyama
 Scenarists: Ryo Nakahara, Masaaki Sakurai, Susumu Takahisa
 Music: Masahisa Takeichi (incidental), Asei Kobayashi (opening/closing themes)
 Theme song performance (GoLion): Ichirou Mizuki (OP- Tatakae! Goraion, ED- Gonin de Hitotsu)
 Production: Toei Animation Co., Ltd. / Toei Advertising Co. Ltd (credited as "Toei Agency")

References

External links

 Voltron on Netflix
 
 
 Voltron: Defender of the Universe at YouTube

Voltron
Adventure anime and manga
American children's animated action television series
American children's animated space adventure television series
American children's animated science fantasy television series
American television series based on Japanese television series
Anime Works
Fictional giants
Fictional robots
First-run syndicated television programs in the United States
Robots in television
Super robot anime and manga
Toonami
Fictional quintets